CD300 molecule like family member b is a protein that in humans is encoded by the CD300LB gene.

Function

CD300LB is a nonclassical activating receptor of the immunoglobulin (Ig) superfamily expressed on myeloid cells (Martinez-Barriocanal and Sayos, 2006 [PubMed 16920917]).[supplied by OMIM, Mar 2008].

References

Further reading